Arlington Archeological Site is a historic archaeological site located near Capeville, Northampton County, Virginia. It is located east of the Custis Tombs. The site includes archaeological features ranging from Accomack Plantation, the first English settlement of the Eastern Shore in 1619, to probable tenant or slave quarter features dating to the second half of the 18th century.  The site also includes the foundations of Arlington mansion, established about 1670 and demolished about 1720.  Arlington plantation was the ancestral home of the Custis family of Virginia.  Archaeological investigations and excavations of the site were conducted in 1987-1988 and 1994.

The former Arlington Mansion lent its name to the Arlington House in Arlington, Virginia.

It was listed on the National Register of Historic Places in 2008.

References

Archaeological sites on the National Register of Historic Places in Virginia
Custis family residences
National Register of Historic Places in Northampton County, Virginia